Jag går nu is the fifth studio album by singer-songwriter Melissa Horn, which was released on 27 November 2015.  Its first single Du går nu was released on 9 October 2015, and its second single "Jag har gjort det igen", on 20 November 2015.

Track listing

Charts

Weekly charts

Year-end charts

References

2015 albums
Melissa Horn albums